The Allure of Tears is a 2011 Chinese romance drama film co-written and directed by Wong Chun-chun and starring Zhou Dongyu, Aarif Rahman, Gigi Leung, Richie Jen, Joe Chen, and Shawn Dou. The film consists of three love stories. The film premiered in China on December 22, 2011.

Cast
 Zhou Dongyu as Geilimei, a patient with a blood cancer.
 Aarif Rahman as You Le, a brain cancer patient and Fuerdai.
 Gigi Leung as Yang Lin, a violinist.
 Richie Jen as Ding Dake, Yang Lin's boyfriend.
 Joe Chen as Zhang Cai, Chen Sheng's girlfriend.
 Shawn Dou as Chen Sheng, a white-collar.

Release
The Allure of Tears was released on December 22, 2011 in mainland China, and on March 1, 2012 in Hong Kong.

Reception
The film was accused of plagiarizing the plot of several Korean films and duplicating the poster concept of the 2005 South Korean film Sad Movie.

References

External links
 
 
 

2011 films
2010s Mandarin-language films
Chinese romantic drama films
2011 romantic drama films